Willie Edwards Jr. (November 13, 1932 – January 23, 1957) was a 24-year-old African American, husband and father, who was murdered by members of the Alabama Ku Klux Klan. He is buried at New Pleasant Valley Cemetery in Letohatchee, Alabama.

Murder 
On the night of January 22, 1957, a small group of Klansmen gathered, armed with pistols and a rifle. They got into a car to look for Willie Edwards, an African American, who had recently been hired as a driver for Winn-Dixie. They thought that he was sleeping with a white woman. Willie had come home from work and an hour later got a call from his boss asking to come back in because one of the other workers had called in sick.  Edwards left to go to work on the afternoon of January 23, never to return home. It is thought he was abducted and beaten  by the Klansmen as they drove him around Montgomery. Then they stopped at the Tyler-Goodwin Bridge, along the Alabama River near Montgomery, and pointed a gun at Edwards, before commanding him to jump off the bridge. He fell 125 feet (38.1 m) to his death. Three months passed before his body was discovered washed up on the shores of the river.  Officials stated that decomposition made it impossible to determine the cause of his death.

Case reopened
In 1976, then State Attorney General Bill Baxley re-opened the Edwards case.
Four people were arrested and charged with Edwards's murder: Sonny Kyle Livingston Jr. (38), Henry Alexander (46), James York (73), and Raymond Britt Jr.  Britt broke the long silence with his affidavit (in exchange for immunity), dated February 20, 1976. In the statement to Attorney General Bill Baxley, Britt described how on the night of January 23, 1957, he along with three other men beat and forced Edwards to jump off the Tyler-Goodwin Bridge into the Alabama River. Alabama Judge Frank Embry, however, dismissed the charges, even with Britt's sworn testimony, because no cause of death was ever established. He concluded that "merely forcing a person to jump from a bridge does not naturally and probably lead to the death of such person."

In 1997, Edwards's daughter, Malinda, requested the District Attorney, Ellen Brooks, to re-investigate her father's death. The District Attorney agreed and began working with the new medical examiner, Dr. James Lauridson. It was found that Edwards's death was caused by a forced jump into the Alabama River in 1957. Therefore, Edwards's cause of death was changed from unknown to homicide. In 1999, the District Attorney presented the new case before a Montgomery County Grand Jury, which subsequently affirmed that Edwards's death was indeed caused by the KKK, but declined to indict anyone specifically of the crime.

Notes

References
Justice Still Absent in Bridge Death, Major W. Cox, Montgomery Advertiser, March 2 1999 (archived)
Suspects Bound In 1957 Slaying, Montgomery Advertiser, February 27, 1976
COLD CASE FILES: Episode 34, The History Channel, December 23 2004
A Changing South Revisits Its Unsolved Racial Killings, Emily Yellin, New York Times, November 8 1999 (archived)

1932 births
1957 deaths
1957 murders in the United States
People from Lowndes County, Alabama
Ku Klux Klan crimes in Alabama
People murdered in Alabama
Racially motivated violence against African Americans
Murdered African-American people
January 1957 events in the United States
1957 in Alabama